The Romblon boobook or Romblon hawk-owl (Ninox spilonotus), is a species of owl in the family Strigidae that is endemic to the Philippines. It is only found on the islands of Tablas, Sibuyan and Romblon. It was previously known as a subspecies of the Philippine hawk-owl, but was reclassified in 2012, as voice and other evidence suggested it was a distinct species. Its natural habitat is tropical moist lowland forest. It is threatened by habitat loss.

Description and taxonomy
EBird describes the bird as "A rare medium-sized owl of lowland and foothill forest on Tablas, Romblon, and Sibuyan islands. Upperparts, chest, and head dark brown and indistinctly barred. Underparts reddish brown. Note the long whiskers around the face and the bright yellow eyes. Probably the only owl in its range except for Mantanani scops-owl, but Romblon boobook is reddish rather than gray and lacks the black line around the face. Song is a phrase of three notes, 'wik weu-weu', with the second and third being descending rasping notes."

The Romblon boobook is an earless species. The males and females are similar in appearance. This species mates around February, nesting in hollow trees. 

Along with the Camiguin boobook and Cebu boobook, it is the largest in the Philippine hawk-owl species complex reaching 25cm tall versus the much smaller Luzon boobook, Mindanao boobook, Mindoro boobook and Sulu boobook, which range in size from 15 to 20cm tall.

Subspecies 
Two subspecies are recognized:

 Ninox spilonotus spilonotus (Sibuyan) - Larger, with a more hiss-like call 
 Ninox spilonotus fischeri (Tablas) - Smaller, with a raspy call

Habitat and conservation status 
Its natural habitats are subtropical or tropical moist lowland primary forest and secondary forests up to an altitude of 1000 metres above sea level.

The IUCN Red List classifies this bird as an endangered species with population estimates of 250 to 999 mature individuals. This species' main threat is habitat loss with wholesale clearance of forest habitats as a result of legal and illegal logging, mining and conversion into farmlands through slash-and-burn and urbanization. 

This species occurs in protected areas such as Mount Guiting-Guiting but protection is lax and logging still supposedly occurs. Mt Palaupau serves as a watershed for Tablas Island. 

There is no species-specific conservation program at present.

References

 Kennedy, R.S., Gonzales P.C., Dickinson E.C., Miranda, Jr, H.C., Fisher T.H. (2000) A Guide to the Birds of the Philippines, Oxford University Press, Oxford.

Romblon boobook
Endemic birds of the Philippines
Fauna of Romblon
Romblon boobook
Romblon boobook